ACLAME (The CLAssification of Mobile genetic Elements) is a database of sequenced mobile genetic elements.

See also
 Gypsy (database)
 Mobile genetic elements

References

External links
 http://aclame.ulb.ac.be (broken at 30/Jun/2022)

Biological databases
Mobile genetic elements